Brandon Thompson (born October 19, 1989) is a former American football defensive tackle. He played college football at Clemson and was drafted by the Cincinnati Bengals in the third round of the 2012 NFL Draft.

Early years
Thompson attended Thomasville High School in Thomasville, Georgia. As a senior, he had 19 sacks and 61 tackles.

Regarded as a four-star recruit by Rivals.com, Thompson was listed as the ninth best defensive tackle prospect of his class.

College career
Thompson was originally redshirted as a freshman in 2008, but had the redshirt taken off after an injury to Jamie Cumbie. He played in the team's final 12 games and recorded 15 tackles and a sack. As a sophomore in 2009, he started all 13 games and had 27 tackles. As a junior in 2010, he had 41 tackles and a sack.

Professional career

Cincinnati Bengals
Thompson was drafted by the Cincinnati Bengals in the third round, 93rd overall, in the 2012 NFL Draft. In 2013, he played in all 16 regular-season games, starting the last seven games, which included the Wild Card playoff game, where he replaced the injured Geno Atkins.

On March 25, 2016, Thompson signed a one-year contract with the Bengals that will keep him through the 2016 season. He was placed on the Reserve/PUP list to start the season after he suffered a torn ACL in Week 17 of the 2015 season. Since he spent the entire season on reserve, his contract tolled, keeping him under contract for the 2017 season.

On August 20, 2017, Thompson was released by the Bengals.

Cleveland Browns
On August 22, 2017, Thompson was signed by the Cleveland Browns. He was released on September 1, 2017 during roster cutdowns.

References

External links
 Cincinnati Bengals bio
 
 Clemson Tigers bio

1989 births
Living people
American football defensive tackles
Clemson Tigers football players
Cincinnati Bengals players
Cleveland Browns players
People from Thomasville, Georgia
Players of American football from Georgia (U.S. state)